This is a list of films produced by the Cinema of Andhra Pradesh film industry based in Hyderabad in the year 1940.

References

1940
Telugu
Telugu films